Symonds is a surname with English origins, derived from Simon. Notable people with the surname include:

Arts, news, and entertainment
Alan Symonds (1946–2006), American theatre technical director
John Symonds (1914–2006), English biographer, playwright and author
John Addington Symonds (1840–1893), English poet and literary critic and advocate of homosexual love
Matthew Symonds (born 1953), English journalist 
Nelson Symonds (1933–2008), Canadian jazz guitarist
Robert Symonds (1926–2007), American actor
Ross Symonds (born 1942), Australian news presenter
William R. Symonds (1851–1934), English painter

Business and commerce
Matt Symonds (born 1968), British entrepreneur
Peter Symonds (c.1528–1586), English merchant and benefactor

Education and academia
Craig Symonds (born 1946), American historian
Richard Symonds (academic) (1918–2006), British UN administrator and academic

Military
James Symonds (born 195?), American naval officer
Thomas Symonds (Royal Navy officer, died 1792) (1731–1792), British naval captain of the American Revolutionary War
Thomas Symonds (Royal Navy officer, died 1894) (1811–1894), British admiral
William Cornwallis Symonds (1810–1841), British army officer, Chief Magistrate of Auckland and Deputy Surveyor-General of New Zealand
William Symonds (1782–1856), British ship designer and administrator, 'Surveyor of the Navy' 1832–1847

Politics
Jermyn Symonds (1816–1883), Member of Parliament in New Zealand
Joseph Symonds (1900–1985), British politician, MP for Whitehaven
Thomas Powell Symonds (1762–1819), British politician, MP for Hereford, and lieutenant colonel South Gloucester Militia
Carrie Symonds (married name Carrie Johnson, born 1988), British political activist

Science
Charles Symonds (1890–1978), English neurologist
Percival Symonds (1893–1960), American educational psychologist
William Samuel Symonds (1818–1887), English geologist

Sports
Andrew Symonds (1975–2022), Australian cricketer
Calvin Symonds, Bermudian cricketer and footballer
Chas Symonds (born 1982), English boxer
Harry Symonds (1889–1945), Welsh cricketer
Noel Symonds (1863–1943), English rower
Pat Symonds (born 1953), British motorsport engineer
Tom Symonds (born 1989), Australian Rugby League Player 
Tony Symonds (born 1962), Australian rules footballer

Other
John Alexander Symonds (born 1935), British police officer who spied for the KGB
Joseph W. Symonds (1840–1918), Justice of the Maine Supreme Judicial Court
Richard Symonds (diarist) (1617–1692?), English royalist and Civil War diarist

See also

Peter Symonds College, Winchester, Hampshire, England 
Symonds Green, Stevenage, Hertfordshire, England
Symonds Yat, village within the Forest of Dean, England
Symonds Yat Rapids, canoeing facility on the River Wye, England
Simmonds
Simonds (disambiguation)
Simmons (surname)
Simons

Patronymic surnames
Surnames from given names